New Musicals Australia is a music theatre workshopping program founded in 2010 by Century Venues with the support of the Australia Council Music Board.

History
New Musicals Australia was founded in 2010 by director and producer Kris Stewart, who also founded the New York Musical Theatre Festival.

Panel
The program selects a number of original musicals by Australian composers, lyricists and bookwriters to be workshopped and presented to a selected panel of theatre professionals. This panel is also involved in the selection of musicals to be workshopped and includes:

 Stephen Schwartz (Patron), composer and lyricist
 Peter Casey, musical director
 Kellie Dickerson, musical director
 Rodney Dobson, performer
 Neil Gooding, producer and director
 Roger Hodgman, director
 Karen Johnson Mortimer, director
 Jennifer Murphy, director and educator
 Guy Noble, musical director
 Peter Ross, producer and director
 Darren Yap, director

Venues
New Musicals Australia is operated out of a collection of entertainment spaces owned by Century Venues.

References

External links
 New Musicals Australia 

Theatre companies in Australia
Theatre in Sydney